Clemensia albata, the little white lichen moth, is a moth of the family Erebidae. It was described by Alpheus Spring Packard in 1864. It is found in eastern North America, west across boreal Canada to south-eastern British Columbia. The range extends along the Pacific Coast south to Monterey Bay in west-central California. The habitat consists of moist forests, including coastal rainforests, oak woodlands and mixed hardwood forests.

The length of the forewings is 10–11 mm. The forewings are pale white and brown grey peppered with darker scales. The hindwings are whitish, smudged with light grey. Adults are on wing from late June to early September.

The larvae feed on arboreal lichens, especially those growing on conifers. They have also been recorded feeding on algae.

Subspecies
Cissura albata albata
Cissura albata umbrata Packard, 1872

References

Cisthenina
Moths described in 1864
Moths of North America